Imagination Movers is an American live-action children's television series based on the format and music of the New Orleans music group of the same name that premiered its first two episodes consecutively on September 6, 2008, on Disney Channel's Playhouse Disney daily block intended for preschoolers, following the premiere of the Mickey Mouse Clubhouse episode Pluto’s Bubble Bath. On February 14, 2011, the series was moved to the Disney Junior block on Disney Channel, which was rebranded from Playhouse Disney.

Each episode of the series features songs written and performed by the aforementioned music group, whose Official Members all starred on and executive produced the show.

On May 24, 2011, it was announced that the series wouldn’t be renewed for a fourth season (which meant a loss of several months of steady employment for the 100 members of the mostly local crew that worked on the show) and that it would end after the remaining episodes of the third season have aired, though the band itself can continue and is open to doing other projects.

After the final episode originally aired on April 14, 2013, reruns continued to air on Disney Junior until May 16, 2014, and the entire series (excluding the March 2011 Concert Special) was made available on the Disney+ streaming service on February 28, 2020.

Overview
The series focuses on the Imagination Movers: Dave (bass, vocals), Rich (drums, percussion, vocals), Smitty (guitars, vocals), and Scott (vocals, mandolin, keyboards), who dwell in the "Idea Warehouse," with doors leading to rooms such as a "Jungle Room," a "Wind Room," a "Beach Room," a "Farm Room," a "Wind Room," a "Lost & Found Room," a "Very Far Away Room," a "Sun Room" and a "Tropical Island Room." In every episode, they aid many clients with problems and think up creative ways to solve problems. They are often aided by Warehouse Mouse, the freeloading, wall-dwelling anthropomorphic mouse, Nina, their spirited and ever-cheerful neighbor, and Knit Knots, Nina's stoic uncle who harbors a dislike for things he deems too "exciting." He appears in the first season, a flashback in the episode from Season 3, "Mouse Scouts," and the aforementioned March 2011 concert special, "Imagination Movers in Concert." Nina now works as a photographer, often visiting the Movers to take pictures for the local newspaper. In Season 3, Nina owns and operates the Idea Cafe. It is also revealed in the episode from Season 2 "Trouble in Paradise," that Nina is Hawaiian (much like Wendy Calio is in real life).

The Movers have special equipment to help them in their tasks. Rich has special "Scribble Sticks" that he can use to draw pictures and write words on the TV screen, Scott has "Wobble Goggles" that allow him to see things from a variety of perspectives, and Dave has a special baseball cap that can store a variety of objects, and Smitty has a special journal.

Each episode ends with the Movers singing “Jump Up” during which brief flashbacks of the episode's events play. In Season 1, the End Credits roll after this, but for Seasons 2 and 3, the End Credits roll during it.

Episodes

Characters
 Dave (played by Dave Poche) – Bass, Vocals 
 Rich (played by Rich Collins) – Drums, Percussion, Guitar, Vocals 
 Smitty (played by Scott "Smitty" Smith) – Guitar, Vocals 
 Scott (played by Scott Durbin) – Vocals, Keyboards, Mandolin, Banjo 
 Warehouse Mouse (voiced by Kevin Carlson)
 Nina (played by Wendy Calio)
 Knit Knots (played by Douglas Fisher) – Manager (Main: Season 1, Guest: Season 3)
 Voicemail (voiced by Kath Soucie)
 Princess Dee (played by Tania Gunadi)

Guest stars include French Stewart, David DeLuise, and Brian Beacock.

Where Is Warehouse Mouse? shorts
Where Is Warehouse Mouse? is a series of 3-minute shorts that aired on Playhouse Disney and Playhouse Disney (UK & Ireland). It featured the character Warehouse Mouse from the main series. The show was set within the Season 2 Imagination Movers studio. Shorts were produced with viewers watching Warehouse Mouse during his daily life.

References

External links
 
 

Disney Junior original programming
2000s American children's comedy television series
2010s American children's comedy television series
2000s American musical comedy television series
2010s American musical comedy television series
2008 American television series debuts
2013 American television series endings
Television series by Disney
English-language television shows
American television shows featuring puppetry
American children's musical television series
American preschool education television series
2000s preschool education television series
2010s preschool education television series
Television series about mice and rats